The January 1894 Calgary municipal election was scheduled for January 15, 1894 to elect a Mayor and nine Councillors to sit on the first Calgary City Council from January 17, 1894 to January 7, 1895. In addition, two members were elected as school trustees.

Background
This was the first election to take place after Calgary was officially incorporated as The City of Calgary under Chapter 33, Ordinance of North-West Territories on January 1, 1894. This was also the first election to establish a Ward system for the election of councillors, splitting the City into three wards, with three representatives each. 

The prior Town Charter required municipal elections to take place in December 1893, however the new City Charter came into effect in such a way as to prevent the election from occurring in December 1893, and would require the election to take place in December 1894. The whole of Calgary City Council resigned to force a January election, which was eventually validated as a general election through the legislature.

Voting rights were provided to any male, single woman, or widowed British subject over twenty-one years of age who are assessed on the last revised assessment roll with a minimum property value of $200.

The election was held under combination of First-past-the-post voting and Plurality block voting where each elector was able to cast a vote for the mayor and up to three votes for the candidates running to be ward councillors.

Results

Mayor

Aldermen
In each ward, each voter was able to cast up to three votes (Plurality block voting).
The number of total votes cast thus is much larger than it would have been if each voter cast just one vote.
Under Block Voting, the largest voting block often takes all the seats, leaving none to the other voters who might make up the majority of voters.

Ward 1

Ward 2

Ward 3

School Trustee

By-Elections
Howard Douglas acclaimed on February 28, 1894 after Thomas Underwood failed to be sworn in within one month of the January 1894 election due to inability to return from England in time.
Joseph Henry Millward elected in a by-election scheduled July 4, 1894 following Joseph Edward Jacques' resignation which was accepted by Council on June 12, 1894. Millward defeated Thomson, and George Murdoch for the seat.
James Stuart Makie elected in a by-election scheduled October 2, 1894 following Joseph Henry Millward's resignation.

See also
List of Calgary municipal elections

References

Sources
Frederick Hunter: THE MAYORS AND COUNCILS  OF  THE CORPORATION OF CALGARY Archived March 3, 2020

Municipal elections in Calgary
1894 elections in Canada
1890s in Calgary